Stenocarpus moorei is a species of flowering plant in the family Proteaceae. It was first described in 1859 by Ferdinand von Mueller in Fragmenta Phytographiae Australiae, but in 1870, George Bentham reduced it to Stenocarpus salignus var. moorei in Flora Australiensis.

The Australian Plant Census considers S. moorei to be a synonym of Stenocarpus salignus but it is an accepted name in Papua New Guinea and Stenocarpus salignus var. moorei is an accepted name in Queensland. Saplings of S. moorei have finely divided leaves like parsley, but as the tree grows, the divisions become fewer and broader until the fully mature tree has simple, entire leaves like those of privet or myrtle.

References

Flora of New Guinea
Flora of Queensland
moorei
Plants described in 1859
Taxa named by Ferdinand von Mueller